Area 10 can refer to:

 Area 10 (Nevada National Security Site)
 Brodmann area 10